Ross Smith (born 12 January 1989) is an English professional darts player who plays in events of the Professional Darts Corporation (PDC). He is the winner of the 2022 European Championship.

Career
Smith began playing in Professional Darts Corporation events in 2005 and made his debut in the Vauxhall Spring Open, reaching the last 16. Smith then reached the final of the WDF Europe Youth Cup, losing to Dutchman Johnny Nijs. Smith had little success afterwards on the PDC circuit and switched to the BDO in 2007. He reached the last 16 of the 2008 British Classic and the 2008 Czech Open.

Smith qualified for the 2009 BDO World Darts Championship, winning one of five places in the qualifiers in Bridlington. He gained victories over Stuart Kellet, Kevin Simm and Henny van der Ster before beating Scotland's Don Haughton to qualify. He faced Scott Waites in the first round, losing 3–0.

In the 2011 BDO World Darts Championship, he beat Tony O'Shea 3–1 in the first round and Willy van de Wiel 4–1 in the second round, before losing to eventual champion Martin Adams 1–5 in the quarter finals. It was announced at the end of the 2012 BDO World Championship that Ross would be one of many players to compete in the rival PDC's 'Q School' the following season. He earned a tour card through the qualifiers Order of Merit. His best result of 2012 came just one week later as he reached the quarter-finals of the second Players Championship and lost 3–6 to Justin Pipe.
Smith qualified for three of the five new European Tour events, but lost in the first round on each occasion. He came very close to defeating world number 5 Simon Whitlock in the third event, the European Darts Open as he led 5–2, but went on to lose 5–6.

Smith headed into 2013 ranked world number 79, and reached his first semi-final on the PDC tour in April at the seventh UK Open Qualifier, where he lost 6–3 to John Part. At the UK Open itself, he fought back from 7–4 down in the third round against Jelle Klaasen to level at 7–7, before being edged out 9–7. He threw a nine-dart finish in the second round of the Gibraltar Darts Trophy against Adrian Lewis, but lost 5–6; this remained the last nine-dart finish achieved on the PDC European Tour until June 2018. Smith won four events on the PDC Challenge Tour during 2013 to top the Order of Merit which has earned him a place in the Grand Slam of Darts and the 2014 World Championship and also a two year PDC tour card which includes all of his 2014 entry fees. In the Grand Slam he lost each of his three games to Simon Whitlock, Wes Newton and Mark Webster to finish bottom of Group G. He played Whitlock in the first round of the World Championship and was beaten 3–0 in sets.

He began 2014 at 54th place in the rankings meaning he rose 25 positions during the previous year. He lost 9–5 in the third round of the UK Open to Kim Huybrechts. Smith's only quarter-final showing of the year came at the 19th Players Championship where he lost 6–3 to Gerwyn Price. He missed out on qualifying for the 2015 World Championship by just £500 on the Pro Tour Order of Merit.

Smith saw off Kevin Thomas at the German Darts Championship and came from 4–1 behind against Peter Wright in the second round to force a deciding leg in which he missed one match dart to lose 6–5. 2015 proved to be a difficult year for Smith as he could only record one more last 32 finish out of the events he played in. Smith explained that the birth of his child and starting a new job had left him with no time to practice. He fell to 74th on the Order of Merit meaning he needed to enter 2016 Q School. Smith hit a nine darter on the first day and on the final day eliminated seven players, concluding with a 5–4 victory over Mick McGowan to win a new two-year tour card and stated that his goal was to get in the top 40 in the rankings.

He failed to qualify for the 2016 UK Open and reached the last 32 of an event for the only time this year at the fourth Players Championship event by beating Peter Wright and Dennis Smith, before losing 6–2 Rowby-John Rodriguez. He reached the main draw of the Gibraltar Darts Trophy and Austrian Darts Open, but was eliminated in the first round of both.
After 2017, during which he took a break from playing darts, he lost his PDC Tour card.

In 2018 he won his Tour card back and in 2019 he reached the world championship where he defeated Paul Lim in the first round, but lost to Daryl Gurney in the second round. He also qualified for the UK Open in 2019 where he reached the quarter finals after defeating Dawson Murschell, Yordi Meeuwisse, Alan Norris, Steve West and James Wade.

In the same year, he also qualified for 2019 European Championship and he defeated in the first round the first seed and the current world number one, Michael van Gerwen 5–6. In the second round he lost to Ricky Evans. For the first time since 2013, he also qualified for 2019 Grand Slam of Darts when he was successful in PDC Qualifying Event. He was unable to win any match in his group that also contained Michael van Gerwen, Adrian Lewis and Jim Williams. For the second time in a row, he also qualified for 2019 Players Championship Finals, but he was eliminated in the first round, losing to Brendan Dolan.

Smith qualified for 2020 PDC World Darts Championship as the 10th highest ranked player via Pro Tour Order of Merit. However, he lost 0–3 to the debutant Ciaran Teehan from Ireland. After the championship, Smith placed 48th in PDC Order of Merit, his highest year end ranking ever, and secured his Tour card for another season.
He was seeded into the third round of 2020 UK Open, but lost in his first match against Jamie Lewis 5–6. Even though the European Tour was cut short due to COVID-19, he qualified for 2020 European Championship, but lost in the deciding leg to Michael Smith. Smith had his best run in 2020 Players Championship Finals, reaching the third round after wins over Kim Huybrechts and Nathan Aspinall, before losing to Damon Heta.

At the end of 2020, he qualified for his third world championship in a row, 2021 PDC World Darts Championship, as fourth highest ranked player from Pro Tour Order of Merit.

In October 2022, Smith reached his first televised major final, defeating Michael Smith 11–8 to win a first major title at the 2022 European Championship. During the group stage of the 2022 Grand Slam of Darts, Smith hit nine 180s in his victory over Michael van Gerwen, a record number for a group stage for the Grand Slam. Smith's year ended with a Third Round World Championship defeat to Dirk van Duijvenbode in a sudden death leg, having missed five match darts. The match featured 31 180s, a record for a best of seven set match, nineteen of which from Smith which equalled the individual record for a match of this format.

Smith won a second PDC ProTour title in March 2023 with victory at Player Championship 5, defeating Gary Anderson 8–6 in the final. The win took him into the Order of Merit's top 16 for the first time in his career.

World Championship results

BDO
 2009: First round (lost to Scott Waites 0–3)
 2011: Quarter-finals (lost to Martin Adams 1–5)

PDC
 2014: First round (lost to Simon Whitlock 0–3)
 2019: Second round (lost to Daryl Gurney 0–3)
 2020: First round (lost to Ciaran Teehan 0–3)
 2021: Second round (lost to José de Sousa 1–3)
 2022: Third round (lost to Dirk van Duijvenbode 3–4)
 2023: Third round (lost to Dirk van Duijvenbode 3–4)

Performance timeline

BDO

PDC

PDC European Tour

PDC major finals: 1 (1 title)

References

External links

{{#ifexpr:<21|}}

1989 births
Living people
Sportspeople from Dover, Kent
People from Deal, Kent
English darts players
European Championship (darts) champions
Professional Darts Corporation current tour card holders